Pandey is a North Indian and Nepalese surname.

Pandey may also refer to:

 Pande family, Nepalese political aristocratic dynasty
 Pandey Aur Pandey, an Indian television series
 Pandeyganj metro station, Lucknow, Uttar Pradesh, India
 Mangal Pandey: The Rising, a 2005 Indian film

See also
 Panday (disambiguation)
 Pandi (disambiguation)